Muker is a village and civil parish at the western end of Swaledale in North Yorkshire, England, within the district of Richmondshire.

The parish includes the hamlets and villages of Angram, Keld, Thwaite, West Stonesdale and Birkdale, as well as the Tan Hill Inn, the highest in England. At the 2001 census the civil parish had a population of 309, reducing to 249 at the 2011 census. In 2015, North Yorkshire County Council estimated the population to be 260.

History 

The earliest recorded evidence for occupation in and around Muker takes the form of a skeleton found, with flints, on Muker Common in the early 20th century. Details suggest a burial of Bronze Age date.

The name of Muker is of Norse origin, derived from the Old Norse mjór akr meaning "the narrow newly cultivated field". The location at the meeting of the River Swale and the Straw Beck with plenty of good meadow land around is most likely why the Norse chose to settle here, giving them the opportunity to make a living out of mixed farming and pastoral farming.

Agriculture continued to be the basis of economy in Muker until lead mining became more important during the late 18th century and the early 19th century. Muker was also a major centre for hand knitting during this period. The importance of these industries is reflected in the many cottages, workshops and other buildings constructed at the time. After knitting machines were invented, hand knitting ended the cottage industry, although it experienced a revival that started in the 1970s.

Muker was historically a township in the large ancient parish of Grinton in the North Riding of Yorkshire.  The Church of St Mary the Virgin was built during the reign of Elizabeth I. A chapel of ease had stood on this site previously but in 1580 it was substantially rebuilt and a graveyard consecrated so that residents of Upper Swaledale no longer had to transport their dead all the way to the parish church in Grinton. The tower, nave and chancel all date from this period. The church was restored in 1891.

In 1866 Muker became a separate civil parish.

With the decline of the mining industry, farming remained the principal occupation. From the late 19th century Muker began to see an increasing number of visitors and holiday makers and today the village is a popular starting point for walks in the area, with a great number of public footpaths in Upper Swaledale.

Village today 
The traditional late-18th- and early-19th-century barns and drystone walls of Swaledale are the most characteristic feature of the landscape. The flower-rich hay meadows around Muker are of international importance and are carefully protected. Farmers receive grants which allow them to farm the land by traditional methods, without using artificial fertilizers.

Muker is also home to the Muker Silver Band, a brass band formed in 1897. The band, which recently celebrated its hundredth anniversary, is now one of the last surviving bands in Swaledale and Wensleydale, and still maintains a busy calendar of public appearances.

Although at one time a centre for lead mining, the main economic activities are now woollen clothing, tourism, grouse shooting and sheep farming.
The pub is called the Farmers Arms. Muker also has a village shop as well as an art gallery, craft shop and a café within the old school building. Originally the vicarage, the Muker village tea shop was built in 1680 and retains much of its 'olde worlde charm' today. A Park Information Point for the Yorkshire Dales National Park can be found at the Muker village shop. The village has one church; the Parish Church of Saint Mary, a Grade II* listed building. Originally dating from around 1580 and having been restored in the 19th century the church was listed on 7 December 1966.  There is a small campsite on the western edge of the village.

Muker was featured in the television series All Creatures Great and Small  in the episode titled "Hampered"; the village was seen as the location of the Darrowby Flower Show.

Muker Show is held every year on the first Wednesday in September.

On 5 July 2014, the Tour de France Stage 1 from Leeds to Harrogate passed through the village.

Popular culture
Muker is featured in the British television series All Creatures Great and Small, in the episode "Hampered", as the venue for the Darrowby Flower Show.  The murder scene of the 1982 film Evil Under the Sun was shot in Muker.

Gallery

References

External links 

 BBC News – Prince Charles's visit to Muker

Villages in North Yorkshire
Civil parishes in North Yorkshire
Swaledale